The 1960 Iowa State Teachers Panthers football team represented Iowa State Teachers College (later renamed University of Northern Iowa) in the North Central Conference during the 1960 NCAA College Division football season. In its first season under head coach Stan Sheriff, the team compiled a 9–1 record (6–0 against NCC opponents) and won the NCC championship.

Five players received all-conference honors: guard George Asleson; quarterback Jerry Morgan; end Mace Reyerson; center Charles Schulte; and guard Wendell Williams. Asleson also received All-America honors from the Associated Press.

Reyerson set a team record, eclipsed 25 years later, with 127 interception return yards. The defense also set a team record on October 29 with seven interceptions against South Dakota.

Schedule

References

Iowa State Teachers
Northern Iowa Panthers football seasons
North Central Conference football champion seasons
Iowa State Teachers Panthers football